Atactopsis is a genus of flies in the family Tachinidae.

Species
A. facialis Townsend, 1917
A. reinhardi Sabrosky & Arnaud, 1965

References

Diptera of North America
Diptera of South America
Exoristinae
Tachinidae genera
Taxa named by Charles Henry Tyler Townsend